Cartwright Gardens is a crescent shaped park and street located in Bloomsbury, London.

The gardens were originally built between 1809 and 1811 as part of the Skinners' Company Estate and were known as Burton Crescent after the developer James Burton. The development attracted many professional and middle-class occupants although the character of the area changed towards the end of the 19th century with an increasing number of lodging houses occupying the buildings.

Burton Crescent was renamed Cartwright Gardens in 1908 after the political reformer and local resident John Cartwright. A bronze statue by George Clarke was added to the garden in 1831 which is set on a granite plinth that has details of Cartwright's works as a reformer. The garden is enclosed by iron railings, with mature plane trees, laid out with grass and circular walks. Unusually the gardens also have several tennis courts available for residents of the surrounding buildings and hotels.

The crescent is composed of several hotels set in their original Georgian buildings. It is also home to the headquarters of the UK AJLM. The east side of the gardens was gradually demolished during the first half of the 20th century. Canterbury Hall, a block of flats built in an Art Deco style, was built here in the 1930s. It later became an intercollegiate halls of residence for the University of London. It was joined by two further halls of residence for the University of London: Commonwealth Hall in the 1950s and Hughes Parry Hall in 1969. These buildings were replaced by the Garden Halls in 2014–2016, although the tower block section of Hughes Parry Hall still stands.

27-43 and 46-63 are listed Grade II on the National Heritage List for England.

Notable residents 
Number 1 - Sir Edwin Chadwick, social reformer

Number 2 - Rowland Hill, Post Office reformer

Number 3 - Sir Thomas Joshua Platt, judge and baron of the Exchequer

Number 9 - John Galt, novelist

Number 10 - Edward Buckton Lamb, architect

Number 11 - Sir John Perring, 1st Baronet, banker, MP and Lord Mayor of London

Number 20 then 34 - Reverend Sydney Smith, writer and cleric

Number 36 - Avery Smith, art historian and cook

Number 37 - Major John Cartwright, the “Father of Reform”

Number 44 - John Charles Mason, civil servant

Number 45 - John William Wright, painter

Number 47 - James White, writer and advertising agent

Number 51 - Horatio Smith, poet

Number 58 – Duncan Forbes, linguist

19th century murders 
In the late 19th century, two murders were committed in Burton Crescent which were never solved.

In December 1878, elderly widow Rachel Samuel was found dead in her kitchen at 4 Burton Crescent. She had been beaten and her wedding ring, some coins and her boots were stolen. A former servant, Mary Donovan, was arrested but there was insufficient evidence to prove she was the culprit.

In March 1884, Annie Yates was found murdered in her room in a brothel at 12 Burton Crescent. She was beaten and strangled by a customer and some money and a ring were taken. The culprit was never caught.

Both premises in which the crimes were committed were on the east side of the gardens and were demolished in the 20th century.

In popular culture 
In The Small House at Allington by Anthony Trollope, Burton Crescent is home to the character John Eames.

The Cartwright Gardens Murder Case by J. S. Fletcher is set in the street.

References

Bloomsbury
Garden squares in London
Grade II listed houses in the London Borough of Camden
James Burton (property developer) buildings
Houses completed in 1811